Jamishan-e Olya (also Romanized as Jāmīshān-e ‘Olyā; also known as Jāmīshān-e Vosţá) is a village in Horr Rural District, Dinavar District, Sahneh County, Kermanshah Province, Iran. At the 2006 census, its population was 124, in 32 families.

References 

Populated places in Sahneh County